is a Japanese badminton player. He won his first international title at the 2017 Osaka International tournament.

Achievements

Summer Universiade 
Men's singles

BWF World Tour (1 runner-up) 
The BWF World Tour, which was announced on 19 March 2017 and implemented in 2018, is a series of elite badminton tournaments sanctioned by the Badminton World Federation (BWF). The BWF World Tour is divided into levels of World Tour Finals, Super 1000, Super 750, Super 500, Super 300, and the BWF Tour Super 100.

Men's singles

BWF Grand Prix (1 runner-up) 
The BWF Grand Prix has two levels, the BWF Grand Prix and Grand Prix Gold. It is a series of badminton tournaments sanctioned by the Badminton World Federation (BWF) since 2007.

Men's singles

  BWF Grand Prix Gold tournament
  BWF Grand Prix tournament

BWF International Challenge/Series (4 titles, 1 runner-up) 
Men's singles

  BWF International Challenge tournament
  BWF International Series tournament

References

External links 
 

Living people
1995 births
Sportspeople from Yamagata Prefecture
Japanese male badminton players
Universiade silver medalists for Japan
Universiade bronze medalists for Japan
Universiade medalists in badminton
Medalists at the 2017 Summer Universiade
21st-century Japanese people